The Lanjigarh–Junagarh section belongs to the Sambalpur division of East Coast Railway Zone in India.

Opened
The Lanjigarh–Junagarh line was completed in two sections. One up to Bhawanipatna which was completed in 2011. Another one from Bhawanipatna to Junagarh. An engine trial run was done on 5 June 2011 from Lanjigarh to Bhawanipatna. On the same day, the first train on this line Bhawanipatna–Bhubaneswar Link Express flagged off by Lok Sabha member and former railway minister Bhakta Charan Das. Bhawanipatna–Junagarh section completion became late due to the non-acquisition of 2.5 km forest land. Bhawanipatna–Junagarh section opened on March 2, 2014.

New line survey
A new line survey for the easy connection of Titlagarh and Junagarh has been made by bypassing Lanjigarh Road. This is an extension of a C-shape curve from G. Ramchandrapur to Norla bypassing Lanjigarh. This will reduce the journey by 30 minutes, otherwise wasted due to the need to rotate the Engine from front to back and back to front at Lanjigarh Road.

A new line survey for Nabarangpur–Jeypore–Malkangiri–Bhadrachalam has been conducted.

References

Rail transport in Odisha

5 ft 6 in gauge railways in India